The 2013 Games of the Small States of Europe, also known as the XV Games of the Small States of Europe, were held in Luxembourg City and surrounding areas. The slogan, as well as the logo, was "Are you ready for the Games?" The opening ceremony was held at the Stade Josy Barthel on 27 May; the closing ceremony was held at the Neumünster Abbey on 1 June.

Games

Participating teams

  (39)
  (137)
  (125)
  (37)
  (167) (host team)
  (63)
  (93)
  (12)
  (89)

Sports

 
 
 
  Mountain biking (2)
  Road (4)
 
 
 
  Trap shooting (1)
 
 
 
 
  Beach volleyball (2)

Note: Basketball and artistic gymnastics were not contested in the 2011 Games of the Small States of Europe. However, squash was dropped for this year's Games, also from 2011.

Venues

Calendar

Medal table

Key:

References

External links
2013 GSSE Official Website 

 
Games of the Small States of Europe
Games of the Small States of Europe
Games of the Small States of Europe
International sports competitions hosted by Luxembourg
Multi-sport events in Luxembourg
2013 in Luxembourgian sport
Sports competitions in Luxembourg City
May 2013 sports events in Europe
June 2013 sports events in Europe
2010s in Luxembourg City